Rodney David Donald (10 October 1957 – 6 November 2005) was a New Zealand politician who co-led the Green Party of Aotearoa New Zealand, along with Jeanette Fitzsimons.

He lived in Christchurch with his partner Nicola Shirlaw, and their three daughters.

Early political career
Donald held Values Party membership from 1974 to 1979 and then Labour Party membership from 1982 to 1988. On becoming national spokesperson of the impartial Electoral Reform Coalition from 1989 to 1993 he had to resign his party membership. After the success of the MMP referendum at the 1993 election he joined the Green Party in February 1994. After he became co-leader of the Greens in 1995, voters first elected him to Parliament in the 1996 election as an Alliance list MP.

The Green Party left the Alliance to stand alone in the 1999 election. He entered the 1999 parliament as number two on the Greens' party list. He retained his list seat in the 2002 and 2005 elections.

Member of Parliament

For many years Donald had a special interest in electoral reform in New Zealand. From 1989 to 1993 he served as spokesperson for the Electoral Reform Coalition during the campaign that led to the introduction of mixed-member proportional (MMP) representation. Subsequently, he played a major part in getting legislation passed to allow STV voting in local body elections in New Zealand. Co-leader Jeanette Fitzsimons described MMP as Donald's greatest legacy.

He also served as the Green Party spokesperson on Buy Kiwi Made, commerce, electoral reform, finance and revenue, land information, regional development and small business, superannuation, sustainable economics, state services, statistics, tourism, trade, and waste.

Death
Shortly after midnight on 6 November 2005, the day before his scheduled swearing-in for his fourth term in Parliament, he died suddenly at his Christchurch home after suffering for a few days from Campylobacter jejuni food poisoning from an unknown source. An autopsy initially ruled out a heart attack, but subsequent test-results determined that death resulted from an inflammation of the heart muscle (myocarditis), which is a very rare consequence of C. jejuni infection. He was 48 years old. His funeral, which took place at the Cathedral of ChristChurch, was attended by over 1,000 people.  His casket arrived on board an electric bus and his wake took place at the adjacent Warner's Hotel. The Parliament showed its respect for Donald by suspending a day of business, and a minute of silence was observed in the House of Representatives.

He was succeeded in the Green Party leadership by Russel Norman.

See also
 Contents of the United States diplomatic cables leak (New Zealand)
 List of members of the New Zealand Parliament who died in office

Notes

References

External links

 VIDEO of Rod Donald speaking on 'Fairness In Trade'
 VIDEO of Rod Donald speaking (humorously) at the Winter 2000 GPANZ conference in Turangi on 3 June 2000 
 Rod Donald biography (Green Party website)

|-

1957 births
2005 deaths
20th-century New Zealand politicians
21st-century New Zealand politicians
Alliance (New Zealand political party) MPs
Deaths from food poisoning
Green Party of Aotearoa New Zealand MPs
Green Party of Aotearoa New Zealand co-leaders
Infectious disease deaths in New Zealand
Members of the New Zealand House of Representatives
New Zealand Labour Party politicians
New Zealand list MPs
People from Christchurch
Place of birth missing
Values Party politicians